The Dunhuang map or Dunhuang Star map is one of the first known graphical representations of stars from ancient Chinese astronomy, dated to the Tang Dynasty (618–907).  Before this map, much of the star information mentioned in historical Chinese texts had been questioned.  The map provides a graphical verification of the star observations, and are part of a series of pictures on one of the Dunhuang manuscripts. The astronomy behind the map is explained in an educational resource posted on the website of the International Dunhuang Project, where much of the research on the map has been done.  The Dunhuang Star map is to date the world's oldest complete preserved star atlas.

History

Early in 1900s (decade), a walled-up cave containing a cache of manuscripts  was discovered by Chinese Taoist Wang Yuan-lu in the Mogao Caves. The scroll with the star chart was found amongst those documents by Aurel Stein when he visited and examined the content of the cave in 1907.  One of the first public mentionings of this script in Western studies was from Joseph Needham's 1959 version of the book Science and Civilisation in China.  Since that time, only a few publications have been devoted to the map, nearly all being Chinese publications.

Colors
The symbols for the stars are divided into three different groups.  The groups are presented in three colors representing the "Three Schools of Astronomical tradition".

See also
 Chinese star maps

References

External links

 "Star Atlas: Translation", by Imre Galambos, 2010, International Dunhuang Project.

Astronomy in China
British Library oriental manuscripts
Chinese manuscripts
Star atlases
Dunhuang manuscripts